Peter Colin Campbell (1810–1876)  was a Scottish clergyman in the Church of Scotland who became the first professor at Queen's University, Canada and was later the first Principal of the University of Aberdeen, a role he held for 21 years.

Life

He was born on 21 January 1810 in the manse of Ardchattan in Argyleshire, the son of Rev George Campbell, the parish minister. He was educated at Edinburgh University, graduating MA in 1829.

In 1835 he was licensed to preach as a Church of Scotland minister by the Presbytery of Inverary, and sent to Canada as minister of St John's Presbyterian Church in Brockville. He was one of the 26 co-founders of Queen's University. In 1840 he was officially appointed as its first professor, in the role of Professor of Classics (Latin and Greek) at Queen's University, but not until 1842 did he begin lecturing (alongside Thomas Liddell as Principal).

He left Queen's in 1844 and returned to Scotland, where he got an appointment as the parish minister of the small Perthshire village of Caputh in September 1845. He remained in this role until December 1854, when he took the prestigious position as Professor of Greek at Aberdeen University, later rising to be Principal of the University.

He lived at 32 College Bounds in Old Aberdeen.

He died on 12 December 1876 and is buried in Old Machar Churchyard in Old Aberdeen.

Family

In January 1838 he married Jessie Wylie (1812-1892) daughter of the Hon James Wylie of Burnside in West Canada. They had six sons and six daughters.

References
 

1810 births
1876 deaths
People from Argyll and Bute
Academics of the University of Aberdeen
Principals of the University of Aberdeen